São Miguel Arcanjo (Portuguese for "Saint Michael Archangel") may refer to the following places:

São Miguel Arcanjo (São Miguel), Santiago, Cape Verde
São Miguel Arcanjo, São Paulo, Brazil